Anandalok is a Bengali film magazine published by the ABP Group from  Kolkata, India. It is usually published on the 12th and 27th of every month.

Anandalok started on 25 January 1975. In early 2000s, Rituparno Ghosh was a significant editor of this magazine. However, the editorial board has now been changed.

According to the Audit Bureau of Circulations (July – December 2007), the total circulation was 76,686. The National Readership Survey 2006 cited readership at 6,78,000.

See also 
Anandalok Awards

References

External links 
Anandalok

1975 establishments in West Bengal
ABP Group
Biweekly magazines published in India
Film magazines published in India
Magazines established in 1975
Mass media in Kolkata